The Masked Rider (also known as The Masked Raider
) is a 1919 American silent Western film serial directed by Aubrey M. Kennedy. Scenes were filmed in Mission San Jose in San Antonio, Castroville and Bandera, Texas, and in Coahuíla, Mexico. The serial was thought to be lost in entirety. However, most episodes have since been found, although many of them are incomplete.

The Serial Squadron purchased a surviving color-toned 35mm nitrate print from the estate of a former Philadelphia projectionist in September 2003, who personally re-edited the film into a sort of condensed feature version many years ago. The film seems to be complete except for Chapter 1, the conclusion of Chapter 3 and most of Chapter 11, with footage also missing from five of the other chapters. Chapter One has been recreated by The Serial Squadron using different actors. What remains is available on dvd.

The Masked Rider is considered to be the first film serial about a masked cowboy, and can thus be considered a prototype "Lone Ranger" of sorts. The 15-episode serial is also significant for being the earliest surviving film appearance of actor Boris Karloff, although he only appears in Chapter 2. His appearance in the film is disputed by some biographers who claim that "Karloff was working in Hollywood at the time and would not have traveled all the way to Texas to do that one bit scene for a salary that was probably less than the train fare." But most sources list Karloff as being in the film.

Plot
This violent Western serial takes place along the Mexican border. When warned by Captain Jack of the Texas Rangers of impending raids, elderly rancher Bill Burrel swears that Mexican cattle rustler Pancho won't do any riding or shooting in the area again. Pancho's lieutenant Santas, (who desires his boss's daughter Juanita's hand, and has been rejected), overhears Burrel and decides to make things rough on Pancho by stirring up trouble for both sides. Pancho and his raiders, sworn to drive the settlers out of the border country, attack the Burrel ranch and kill Burrel, and his son Harry swears to make Pancho pay. In the conflict that follows, Pancho is knocked out and his hands purposely crushed in a press by masked men, who he thinks are Texas Rangers. The torture was actually carried out by the traitorous Santas and his friend Rodriguez, but Pancho blames the Texas Rangers for his injuries and swears revenge, and they all resolve to kill each other.

In the succeeding chapters, Pancho and his gang menace Harry Burrel and his sweetheart Ruth Chadwick, and kidnap Harry's younger sister Blanche Burrel, inflicting tortures upon them. Pancho's evil demands are carried out by the black-garbed Masked Rider, who rides onto the scene without warning to kidnap, assault, or shoot the Texas Rangers, their relatives, and even their horses. Pancho's daughter Juanita is alarmed by her father's cruelty and does everything she can to prevent his murdering any of his captives whenever she can. She also falls in love with Captain Jack Hathaway of the Rangers.

Rugged "Ma" Chadwick, Ruth's mother, helps the Rangers when Blanche and later Ruth are both kidnapped. Interesting shooting locations include a hacienda complex in Sabinas, Mexico, an ancient mission in San Antonio, the gigantic Medina Dam (at which one stupendous action sequence was apparently improvised as the scene does not appear in the original shooting script), and the "Hole in the Wall", a labyrinth-like passage through the mountains.

Cast
 Harry Myers as Harry Burrel
 Ruth Stonehouse as Ruth Chadwick, Harry's sweetheart
 Paul Panzer as Pancho, cattle rustler and bandit
 Edna M. Holland as Juanita, Pancho's daughter
 Marie Treador as Ma Chadwick, Ruth's mother (Treador was the producer's wife)
 Blanche Gillespie as Blanche Burrel, Harry's younger sister
 Robert Taber as Santas, Pancho's lieutenant
 George Chapman as Captain Jack Hathaway of the Texas Rangers
 Boris Karloff as the menacing Mexican in saloon, appearing in Chapter 2 only
 George Murdock
 George Cravy

Chapter Titles
 The Hole in the Wall
 In the Hands of Pancho
 The Capture of Juanita
 The Kiss of Hate
 The Death Trap
 Pancho Plans Revenge
 The Fight on the Dam
 The Conspirators Foiled
 Exchange of Prisoners
 Harry's Perilous Leap
 To the Rescue
 The Impostor
 Coals of Fire
 In the Desert's Grip
 Retribution

See also
 Boris Karloff filmography
 List of film serials
 List of film serials by studio
 Medina Dam featured in the serial

References

External links

 

1919 films
1910s rediscovered films
1919 Western (genre) films
American black-and-white films
American silent serial films
Rediscovered American films
Silent American Western (genre) films
1910s American films